Riemenstalden is a municipality in Schwyz District in the canton of Schwyz in Switzerland. The villages can be reached by road from Sisikon (Canton of Uri).

Geography
Of this area, 49.3% is used for agricultural purposes, while 25.5% is forested. Of the rest of the land, 0.2% is settled (buildings or roads) and the remainder (25%) is non-productive (rivers, glaciers or mountains).

Alplersee is located on the slopes of Rophaien.

Demographics

, 2.4% of the population was made up of foreign nationals. Over the last 10 years the population has grown at a rate of 20%. All of the population speaks German.

 the gender distribution of the population was 57.6% male and 42.4% female.  The age distribution, in Riemenstalden is; 12 people or 20.3% of the population is between 0 and 19.  15 people or 25.4% are 20 to 39, and 18 people or 30.5% are 40 to 64.  The senior population distribution is 10 people or 16.9% are 65 to 74.  There are 3 people or 5.1% who are 70 to 79 and 1 person or 1.69% of the population who is over 80.

 there are 24 households, of which 6 households (or about 25.0%) contain only a single individual.

In the 2007 election the most popular party was the SVP which received 59.5% of the vote.  The next three most popular parties were the CVP (26.2%), the SPS (7.1%) and the FDP (6%).

In Riemenstalden about 40% of the population (between age 25-64) have completed either non-mandatory upper secondary education or additional higher education (either university or a Fachhochschule).

Riemenstalden has an unemployment rate of 0%.  , there were 23 people employed in the primary economic sector and about 10 businesses involved in this sector.  No one is employed in the secondary sector.  11 people are employed in the tertiary sector, with 3 businesses in this sector.

The historical population is given in the following table:

References

Municipalities of the canton of Schwyz